The year 1934 was marked, in science fiction, by the following events.

Births and deaths

Births 
 January 23 : Michel Jeury, French writer, (died 2015).
 March 5 : Jacques Sadoul, French writer and editor, (died 2013)
 May 31 : Jacques Goimard, French writer and editor, (died 2012).
 August 16 : Andrew J. Offutt, American writer, (died 2013)
 November 9 :  Carl Sagan, American astronomer and writer, (died 1996).

Deaths

Events

Literary releases

Novels 
 Legion of Space Series, by Jack Williamson.
  Triplanetary, by Edward Elmer Smith.

Stories collections

Short stories 
 Night on the Galactic Railroad, by Kenji Miyazawa.

Comics

Audiovisual outputs

Movies

Awards 
The main science-fiction Awards known at the present time did not exist at this time.

See also 
 1934 in science
 1933 in science fiction
 1935 in science fiction

References

Science fiction by year

science-fiction